A myxoid cyst is a cutaneous condition often characterized by nail plate depression and grooves.

See also 
 Scleroderma
 List of cutaneous conditions
 List of radiographic findings associated with cutaneous conditions

References 

Mucinoses